Hornitos is a coastal town located  north of Mejillones and  north of Antofagasta in Chile's Antofagasta Region. Hornitos is part of the Mejillones commune, but its residents are mainly Antofagasta inhabitants. Nearly 300 houses comprise the town, but almost none of them are inhabited during the winter.

Hornitos is a beach town with no permanent inhabitants.

See also
 List of towns in Chile

Beaches of Chile
Landforms of Antofagasta Region
Populated places in Antofagasta Province
Coasts of Antofagasta Region